The Bhaba valley (also known as Wangpo in the local Kinnauri language is a valley in the northern Indian state of Himachal Pradesh. It is formed by the Bhaba river in the district of Kinnaur, which originates near Bhaba Pass. Bhaba valley is constituted by in total five panchayats of Bhaba Nagar tehsil. The Wangtu bridge is the gateway to the valley. There are 17 villages within the valley. These villages are in turn divided into five Panchayats: Katgaon, Yangpa 1, Ynagpa 2, Kraba  and Kafnu. Most of the valley's inhabitation is in Katgaon village.

The Bhaba Pass connects the Bhaba Valley on the Kinnaur side with the Pin valley on the Spiti side.

Gallery

References

External links
Bhabha Valley
Bhaba Valley Trek, Kinnaur
Pin Bhaba Pass-A high-altitude crossover trek in Himachal Pradesh

Geography of Kinnaur district
Kinnaur district
Valleys of Himachal Pradesh